The college was established in 1948 as Abra Valley Junior College and was later renamed to Abra Valley College. In 1994, its name was again changed to Abra Valley Colleges. It is an academic institution located in Bangued, Abra, Philippines, which offers courses in nursing, criminology, hospitality and restaurant management, and law.

History
In the province of Abra, located across the road of the former Abra High School (now Abra State Institute of Sciences and Technology-ASIST Bangued Campus) Abra Valley Colleges was the pioneer in tertiary-level institution.

The remnants of the Bayquen Hotel which was leveled to the ground in World War II was the present location of its building only made of bamboo materials and roofed with cogon. Students of those times even have to use umbrellas to shield themselves from raindrops and even raise their feet to the chairs to avoid the water on floor.

In 1948, through the leadership of Mr. Pedro V. Borgoña founded the Abra Valley Junior College, Inc. The old bamboo building was later on re-built into a concrete building that rose into a three-storey structure.

Graduates from most secondary schools of the province particularly from Abra High School enrolled here. The school was renamed Abra Valley College dropping the word "Junior" from the original name.

In 1993 the school was in public auction, but on December 22 of the same year, the eldest son of the founder Mr. Francis A. Borgoña redeemed the institution with the aid from his cousin Mr. Francisco del Rosario, and the school was renamed as Abra Valley Colleges.

In 1998, a Bachelor of Science in Criminology was offered. And in 2000 courses were offered such as Bachelor of Secondary Education, Bachelor of Elementary Education, Bachelor of Science in Hotel & Restaurant Management, and Bachelor of Science in Information Technology.

Struggles and problems
In the 1980s, Abra Valley College has number of students enrolled had decreased. The founder who was still the sitting president of the school grew ill. His wife died, and on December 2, 1994, he died too.

The school had suffered from serious problems, but with the determination of the present chairman of the board and President Mr. Francis A. Borgoña and the support of the employees, together they stood firm through thick and thin. The college was given another 50 years of corporate life by the Securities and Exchange Commission (SEC) with legitimate reason in spite of legal charges as regards its dissolution. The school was re-purchased from Mr. Francisco del Rosario making the college free from any debts.

On 23 September 2009, the Commission on Higher Education called for the closing of its law school  for posting a performance percentile rank of zero in the bar examinations from 1999 to 2009.

Present time
The college has produced professionals such as nurses, criminologists and educators. The college has a Speech Laboratory, a radio network partnered with the Manila Broadcasting Company (MBC) for the "Radio ng Bayan" station (95.3 HOT-FM)  and the Abra Valley Colleges Community Health Research and Development Foundation, Inc. in 2001. In 2002, the AVC-ISP (Internet Service Provider) was created which served the students, employees, and their clients in private and private government offices of Bangued, Abra.

The school has a Computer Laboratory, and an electronic library or E-Lib with 16 computer units which provide the internet.

A six-storey building has been provided to accommodate courses for Bachelor of Laws, Bachelor of Civil Engineering and Bachelor of Science in Social Work. A Research, Extension and Development Center has been established. A postgraduate program is offered.

Courses

Bachelor of Laws (LLB)
Bachelor of Arts (AB) major in
Mass Communication
English
Political Science
History
Bachelor of Science in Architecture (BSA)
Bachelor of Science in Civil Engineering (BSCE)
Bachelor of Science in Business Administration (BSBA) major in
Financial Management
Human Resource Development Management
Marketing Management
Bachelor of Science in Criminology (BSCRIM) - Accredited Level 1 by PACUCOA
Bachelor of Elementary Education (BEED)
Bachelor of Secondary Education (BSED) major in
English
Filipino
Mathematics
Social Studies
General Science
Bachelor of Science in Hotel and Restaurant Management (BSHRM)

Ladderized Program with Areas of Competency
NC II Housekeeping
NC II Front Office Services
NC II Commercial Cooking

B.Sc in Information Technology (BSIT)
B.Sc in nursing (BSN)
B.Sc in Social Work (BSSW)
Two year Computer Secretarial Course (CSC)
Two year Junior Secretarial Course (JSC)
One year General Secretarial Course (GCC)
High school
Elementary

References

External links
 Official website
 Manila Bulletin

Universities and colleges in Abra (province)